J. C. Hoffman was a member of the Wisconsin State Assembly.

Biography
Hoffman was born on July 3, 1856 in Waldo, Wisconsin. On June 1, 1879, he married Martha F. Edgerly. They would have four children before her death on July 3, 1914. Hoffman died on November 15, 1938 in Medford, Wisconsin and was buried there.

Career
Hoffman was elected to the Assembly in 1924. Other positions he held include Chairman (similar to Mayor) of Browning, Wisconsin and a member of the Taylor County, Wisconsin Board of Supervisors. He was a Republican.

References

External links

The Political Graveyard

People from Waldo, Wisconsin
Republican Party members of the Wisconsin State Assembly
Mayors of places in Wisconsin
County supervisors in Wisconsin
1856 births
1938 deaths
Burials in Wisconsin
People from Taylor County, Wisconsin